The following highways are numbered 962:

United States